Alet-les-Bains station (French: Gare d'Alet-les-Bains) is a French railway station in Alet-les-Bains, Occitanie, France. The station is on the Carcassonne–Rivesaltes line. The station is currently served by TER Occitanie bus services between Limoux and Quillan. Previous train services between Limoux and Quillan were suspended in 2018, and are expected to be resumed in 2025.

See also 

 List of SNCF stations in Occitanie

References

Railway stations in France opened in 1878
Defunct railway stations in Aude